Clintonia is a genus of flowering plants in the lily family Liliaceae. Plants of the genus are distributed across the temperate regions of North America and eastern Asia, in the mesic understory of deciduous or coniferous forests. The genus, first described by Constantine Samuel Rafinesque in 1818, was named for DeWitt Clinton (1769–1828), a naturalist and politician from the U.S. state of New York. For this reason, plants of the genus are commonly known as Clinton's lily. The common name bluebead (and by extension bluebead lily) refer to the distinctive fruit of members of the genus. Since fruit color varies somewhat across species, the common name bead lily is used as well.

Description 

The genus Clintonia is morphologically diverse. Species are herbaceous perennial plants growing from rhizomatous underground stems with thin, fibrous roots. They grow from 1.5 to 8 dm tall. They have 2 to 6 basal leaves arising from the rhizome crown, the basal leaves are sessile and sheathing, and the cauline leaves have a stalk. The blade of each leaf has a prominent central vein and entire margins, and the bottom ends are obovate to oblanceolate in shape. The leaf apex is acute to abruptly short-acuminate, often mucronate (ending abruptly in a short sharp point).  The inflorescences are terminal, and the flowers are arranged into short racemes or umbel-like clusters, with 1 to 45 flowers.  The flowers have 6 tepals with nectaries present.  The stamens are inserted at the base of the perianth, and the anthers are oblong-obovate to oblong-linear shaped. The rounded to cylinder shaped ovary is superior with two chambers (sometime three). Each chamber produces 2 to 10 ovules.  The smooth fruits are berry-like, round to egg-shaped, metallic blue to black in color. Four to thirty seeds are produced in each fruit and the seeds are shiny brown, round and the ends are angled with 2 or 3 faces.

Taxonomy 

, Plants of the World Online (POWO) accepts the following species in the genus Clintonia Raf.:

POWO also accepts the infraspecies Clintonia udensis var. alpina (Kunth ex Baker) H.Hara but some authorities do not accept this name.

Molecular phylogenetic studies demonstrate two major disjunct clades, in eastern Asia and in North America respectively, and with the latter in East and in West. Within the family Liliaceae, Clintonia is a sister group to Medeola.

Distribution 

There are five species of Clintonia, four in North America and one in Asia.

North America 

Two species of Clintonia occur in western North America:

 C. andrewsiana is localized along the West Coast of the United States, from central California to southwestern Oregon.
 C. uniflora ranges from central California to southern Alaska, extending east into Alberta and Montana.

The remaining two species are found in eastern North America:

 C. borealis is wide-ranging, from Newfoundland and Labrador to Manitoba, extending south across New England and the Great Lakes region into the Appalachian Mountains.
 C. umbellulata is endemic to the Appalachian Mountains in the eastern United States.

Canada 

 Alberta: C. uniflora
 British Columbia: C. uniflora
 Manitoba: C. borealis
 New Brunswick: C. borealis
 Newfoundland and Labrador: C. borealis
 Nova Scotia: C. borealis
 Ontario: C. borealis
 Prince Edward Island: C. borealis
 Quebec: C. borealis
 Saskatchewan: none

The species C. borealis is also known to occur on the islands of Saint Pierre and Miquelon, a French territory near the Canadian province of Newfoundland and Labrador.

United States 

 Alabama: none
 Alaska: C. uniflora
 Arizona: none
 Arkansas: none
 California: C. andrewsiana, C. uniflora
 Colorado: none
 Connecticut: C. borealis
 Delaware: none
 District of Columbia: none
 Florida: none
 Georgia: C. borealis, C. umbellulata
 Hawaii: none
 Idaho: C. uniflora
 Illinois: C. borealis
 Indiana: C. borealis
 Iowa: none
 Kansas: none
 Kentucky: C. umbellulata
 Louisiana: none
 Maine: C. borealis
 Maryland: C. borealis, C. umbellulata
 Massachusetts: C. borealis
 Michigan: C. borealis
 Minnesota: C. borealis
 Mississippi: none
 Missouri: none
 Montana: C. uniflora
 Nebraska: none
 Nevada: none
 New Hampshire: C. borealis
 New Jersey: C. borealis
 New Mexico: none
 New York: C. borealis, C. umbellulata
 North Carolina: C. borealis, C. umbellulata
 North Dakota: none
 Ohio: C. borealis, C. umbellulata
 Oklahoma: none
 Oregon: C. andrewsiana, C. uniflora
 Pennsylvania: C. borealis, C. umbellulata
 Rhode Island: C. borealis
 South Carolina: C. umbellulata
 South Dakota: none
 Tennessee: C. borealis, C. umbellulata
 Texas: none
 Utah: none
 Vermont: C. borealis
 Virginia: C. borealis, C. umbellulata
 Washington: C. uniflora
 West Virginia: C. borealis, C. umbellulata
 Wisconsin: C. borealis
 Wyoming: none

Asia 

The species C. udensis is found in eastern Asia, from the Russian Far East to southeast Asia, extending from the Kuril Islands in the Pacific Ocean to the Western Himalaya region.

Ecology 

Spring blooming.

Cultivation

Clintonia species are cultivated as garden subjects in shade gardens, grown for the glossy foliage, small lily-like flowers, and blue fruits, and their ability to live in heavy shade. They grow best in cool, organic-rich, acid soils that retain moisture and when grown well form dense slowly spreading clumps.

See also

 Bead lily
 Bluebead (disambiguation)
 List of plants known as lily

References

Bibliography

External links

 
Liliaceae genera
Taxa named by Constantine Samuel Rafinesque